Kabir Ahmed is a Major General of Bangladesh Army and Military Secretary to Prime Minister of Bangladesh, Sheikh Hasina since March, 2022. Prior to join Prime Minister's office, he was posted at Directorate General of Forces Intelligence. He elevated to the rank of Major General on 20 July 2022.

Career 
Kabir was commissioned from Bangladesh Military Academy with 24th long course in the Infantry corps. He served as Brigade Commander of 11th Infantry Brigade at Sylhet Cantonment. He was a Brigadier General when he was appointed Military secretary to the Prime Minister Sheikh Hasina. He also served as Director of Counter Terrorism and Intelligence Bureau(CTIB) from 2019 to 2021.

References 

Living people
Bangladesh Army generals
Bangladeshi military personnel
Bangladeshi generals
Year of birth missing (living people)